The 2002–03 Wisconsin Badgers men's basketball team represented University of Wisconsin–Madison as a member of the Big Ten Conference during the 2002–03 NCAA Division I men's basketball season. The head coach was Bo Ryan, coaching his second season with the Badgers. The team played its home games at the Kohl Center in Madison, Wisconsin. Wisconsin finished 24-8, 12-4 in Big Ten play to finish as outright regular season champions for the first time since 1947.

In the quarterfinals of the Big Ten tournament in Chicago, top-seeded Wisconsin was upset by Ohio State. The Badgers received an at-large bid to the NCAA tournament as the fifth seed in the Midwest Region, where they won twice in Spokane, then lost to No. 1 seed Kentucky by six points in the Sweet Sixteen at Minneapolis.

Roster

Schedule

|-
!colspan=12| Regular Season

|-
!colspan=12| Big Ten tournament

|-
!colspan=12| NCAA tournament

References

Wisconsin Badgers men's basketball seasons
Wisconsin
Badge
Badge
Wisconsin